Jawaharlal Nehru Medical College, Belgaum (JNMC) is a constituent medical school of KLE University. It is located at Belgaum in Karnataka state. The college was earlier affiliated to the state unitary Rajiv Gandhi University of Health Sciences.

Description
The college is recognized by the Medical Council of India, Malaysian Medical Council , and listed in W.H.O. World Directory of Medical Schools. The college has received funding from Indian Council of Medical Research, World Health Organization and National Institutes of Health, USA.

Location
The college is located in a 100 acre campus in Belgaum. The college has a 1000-bed free charitable block as well as the 1250-beds KLE Society's Prabhakar Kore Hospital and Medical Research Centre on campus. The college also runs a rural hospital: Dr. Kamal Hospital & Medical Research Centre, 150 km away at Ankola.

Ranking 

JNMC was ranked 39 among medical colleges in India in 2020 by India Today.

See also
 Jawaharlal Nehru Medical College, Wardha, Maharashtra, India
 Jawaharlal Nehru Medical College, Ajmer, Rajasthan, India
 Jawaharlal Nehru Medical College, Aligarh, Uttar Pradesh, India
 Jawaharlal Nehru Medical College, Bhagalpur, Bihar, India

References

External links

Medical colleges in Karnataka
Monuments and memorials to Jawaharlal Nehru
Universities and colleges in Belgaum
1963 establishments in Mysore State
Educational institutions established in 1963